Hacıhamzalı is a village in Tarsus district of Mersin Province, Turkey. It is to the north of Tarsus and Berdan Dam reservoir. The population of village was 1391  as of 2012 which makes Hacıhamzalı one of the more populous villages of the district.

References

Villages in Tarsus District